NWA San Francisco was a professional wrestling promotion headquartered in San Francisco, California in the United States. Founded in 1935 by "The Utica Panther" Joe Malcewicz (1897–1962), the promotion joined the National Wrestling Alliance in 1949. It traded until 1961, when it folded due to competition from the upstart Big Time Wrestling promotion. The promotion's heartland was San Francisco, with the San Francisco Civic Auditorium as its core venue, but it also ran shows in other Northern Californian cities including Fresno, Oakland, Richmond, Sacramento, San Jose, Santa Rosa, Stockton, and Vallejo.

History 
"The Utica Panther" Joe Malcewicz was born on March 17, 1897, in Utica, New York. He had his first recorded professional wrestling bout in 1914 and challenged for the World Heavyweight Wrestling Championship on several occasions in the 1920s. He retired from professional wrestling at the age of 38 and moved to promoting. In November 1935, he succeeded Jack Ganson as the leaseholder of San Francisco's New Dreamland Auditorium, buying out Ganson's interest for $15,000 after Paul Bowser and Toots Mondt convinced him to step aside. He held his first show on November 26, 1935. Malcewicz subsequently entered into an agreement with Dan Kolov that gave him exclusive rights to promote wrestling events in a dozen towns and cities in Northern California and Nevada.

On November 26, 1949, Malcewicz joined the newly-formed National Wrestling Alliance. His promotion became NWA San Francisco, the NWA affiliate for San Francisco, giving Malcewicz an effective monopoly over professional wrestling in the area. He remained a member until 1962, although his membership briefly lapsed in 1956–1957 when he was late signing paperwork. Over the course of his membership, Malcewicz sat on both the board of directors and the NWA World Heavyweight Championship committee.

In 1950, Malcewicz created the NWA World Tag Team Championship (San Francisco version), the second regional NWA World Tag Team Championship. Malcewicz built a strong tag team division, with the top stars including brothers Ben and Mike Sharpe, who held the championship on 18 occasions.

In 1951, Malcewicz and 50th State Big Time Wrestling promoter Al Karasick organized the "Shriners" tour of Japan. Malcewicz and Karasick built a strong relationship with Rikidōzan and his Japan Wrestling Association, with the promotions trading wrestlers across the Pacific. In May 1956, the Sharpe Brothers briefly lost the San Francisco version of the NWA World Tag Team Championship to Koukichi Endo and Rikidōzan during a tour of Japan. Bouts between the Sharpe Brothers and Rikidōzan provided a patriotic outlet for citizens of occupied Japan, with the Sharpe Brothers using villainous tactics against the heroic Rikidōzan, who would inevitably rally to defeat them, drawing chants of "Long live Japan!"

Malcewicz regularly recruited athletes from other sports in an attempt to create new stars. Crossover athletes appearing with NWA San Francisco during the 1950s included strongman Doug Hepburn and National Football League players Art Michalik, Gene Lipscomb, Leo Nomellini, and Cy Williams.

After sustaining a severe knee injury, NWA San Francisco wrestler "Professor" Roy Shire decided to move into promoting in direct competition to Malcewicz, defying the territorial boundaries decreed by the NWA. In October 1960, he registered the Pacific Coast Athletic Corp. with the California State Athletic Commission over Malcewicz's objections. In response to the threat posed by Shire's Big Time Wrestling promotion, Malcewicz – who had long resisted the emergence of televised wrestling, fearing it would compete with live events – begun running shows each Monday night on KTVU in 1961, as well as moving from the Civic Auditorium to the Kezar Pavilion as a cost-cutting measure. Despite this, Shire prevailed in the short territorial battle, with his roster – built around the flamboyant aerial performer Ray Stevens – proving more popular than the slower-moving heavyweights who made up Malcewicz's roster, and Malcewicz folded NWA San Francisco in 1961. He died on April 20, 1962, of a heart attack.

Championships

Alumni
 Fred Atkins
 Johnny Barend		
 Lord James Blears
 Bobo Brazil
 Primo Carnera
 Dean Detton
 Emil Dusek
 Ernie Dusek
 Gorgeous George
 Hard Boiled Haggerty
 Doug Hepburn
 Gene Kiniski
 Killer Kowalski
 Lord Athol Layton
 Gene Lipscomb
 Wild Bill Longson
 Great Lothario
 Bobby Managoff
 Earl McCready
 Danny McShain
 Art Michalik
 Bill Miller
 Ed Miller
 Bronko Nagurski
 Leo Nomellini
 Rikidōzan
 Buddy Rogers
 Frank Sexton
 Ben Sharpe
 Mike Sharpe
 Sándor Szabó
 Chris Tolos
 John Tolos
 Enrique Torres
 Mike Valentino
 Dick Warren
 Cy Williams
 Yukon Eric

Footnotes

External links
 National Wrestling Alliance [San Francisco office]

 
1935 establishments in California
1962 disestablishments in California
Companies based in San Francisco
National Wrestling Alliance members
Professional wrestling in San Francisco
Sports in the San Francisco Bay Area